Ancistrus mullerae is a species of catfish in the family Loricariidae. It is native to South America, where it occurs in the Iguazu River basin in the state of Paraná in Brazil. The species reaches 12.5 cm (4.9 inches) SL. It was described in 2009 by A. G. Bifi, C. S. Pavanelli, and C. H. Zawadzki, alongside two other species in the genus Ancistrus from the same river basin: A. abilhoai and A. agostinhoi.

References 

Fish described in 2009
mullerae